Ji So-yun (born 21 February 1991) is a South Korean professional footballer who plays as a midfielder for WK League club Suwon FC and the South Korean national team.

Club career

Ji started her career in Japan, playing for L. League champions INAC Kobe Leonessa between 2011 and 2013. In November 2013, Ji was subject to a transfer bid from English club Chelsea. She agreed to a two-year contract in January 2014. When the transfer was officially confirmed later that month, Chelsea manager Emma Hayes said of Ji: "She is one of the best midfielders in the world and our fans will love her." In one of her final matches for the Japanese club, Ji scored against her soon-to-be new club, Chelsea, in the International Women's Club Championship final.

Ji was named Players' Player of the Year after her first season in England, as Chelsea narrowly missed out on the FA WSL 1 league title on the last day of the season. She was named PFA Women's Players' Player of the Year in April 2015 and was also named in the PFA WSL Team of the Year.

In the 2015 FA Women's Cup Final, staged at Wembley Stadium for the first time, Ji scored the only goal of the match to win the Cup for Chelsea. In October 2015 she also scored in Chelsea's 4–0 win over Sunderland which secured the club's first FA WSL title and a League and Cup double.

On 1 April 2018, Ji made her 100th appearance for Chelsea in a 1–1 draw against Arsenal.

In the light of her performances for Chelsea over the years and the instrumental role she played in Chelsea's 2020–21 FA WSL winning team, Suzanne Wrack of The Guardian claimed that Ji was the best foreign player in the history of WSL.

After spending eight years with Chelsea, Ji left the club following the 2021–22 season. She made over 200 appearances and scored 68 goals in all competitions, and won six league titles, four FA Cups, two league cups, and one Community Shield.

On 24 May 2022, Ji returned to her homeland and joined WK League side Suwon FC, her first spell with a South Korean club. On her WK League debut on 18 August 2022, she scored a brace in a 3–0 victory against Boeun Sangmu.

International career
Ji represented South Korea at under-17 level and was part of the under-20 team that finished as runners-up at the 2009 AFC U-19 Women's Championship, and in third place at the 2010 FIFA U-20 Women's World Cup.

In October 2006, Ji made her senior team debut while playing at the 2006 Peace Queen Cup. On 30 November 2006, she became the youngest goalscorer for the South Korean senior team, after scoring two goals against Chinese Taipei at the 2006 Asian Games.

Ji is the all-time top goal scorer of the South Korean women's national team with 66 goals.

Career statistics

Club

International
Scores and results list South Korea's goal tally first, score column indicates score after each Ji goal.

Honours
INAC Kobe Leonessa
Nadeshiko League Division 1: 2011, 2012, 2013
Empress's Cup: 2011, 2012, 2013
Nadeshiko League Cup: 2013
International Women's Club Championship: 2013

Chelsea
FA Women's Super League: 2015, 2017, 2017–18, 2019–20, 2020–21, 2021–22
Women's FA Cup: 2014–15, 2017–18, 2020–21, 2021–22
FA Women's League Cup: 2019–20, 2020–21
Women's FA Community Shield: 2020

South Korea U20
 FIFA U-20 Women's World Cup third place: 2010
 AFC U-19 Women's Championship runner-up: 2009

South Korea Universiade
 Summer Universiade: 2009

South Korea
 Asian Games bronze medal: 2010, 2014, 2018
 AFC Women's Asian Cup runner-up: 2022

Individual
 FIFA Women's World Player of the Year nominee: 2010 (6th place)
 The Best FIFA Women's Player nominee: 2020 (11th place)
 FIFA FIFPro Women's World11 nominee: 2020
 FIFA U-20 Women's World Cup Silver Ball: 2010
 FIFA U-20 Women's World Cup Silver Shoe: 2010
 Summer Universiade Most Valuable Player: 2009
 FA Women's Players' Player of the Year: 2014
 PFA Women's Players' Player of the Year: 2014–15
 PFA Team of the Year (FA WSL): 2014–15, 2015–16, 2017–18, 2018–19, 2019–20
 AFC U-19 Women's Championship top goalscorer: 2009
 Korean FA Women's Player of the Year: 2010, 2011, 2013, 2014, 2019, 2021, 2022
 IFFHS Asian Women's Team of the Decade: 2011–2020
 IFFHS Asian Women's Team of All Time: 2021
 WK League Midfielder of the Year: 2022

References

External links

 

1991 births
Living people
Chungju Ji clan
Footballers from Seoul
Women's association football midfielders
South Korean women's footballers
South Korea women's under-17 international footballers
South Korea women's under-20 international footballers
South Korea women's international footballers
South Korean expatriate footballers
INAC Kobe Leonessa players
Chelsea F.C. Women players
Suwon FC Women players
Nadeshiko League players
Women's Super League players
WK League players
Expatriate women's footballers in Japan
Expatriate women's footballers in England
South Korean expatriate sportspeople in Japan
South Korean expatriate sportspeople in England
Asian Games medalists in football
Footballers at the 2006 Asian Games
Footballers at the 2010 Asian Games
Footballers at the 2014 Asian Games
Footballers at the 2018 Asian Games
2015 FIFA Women's World Cup players
Asian Games bronze medalists for South Korea
Medalists at the 2010 Asian Games
Medalists at the 2014 Asian Games
Medalists at the 2018 Asian Games
FIFA Century Club
Universiade gold medalists for South Korea
Universiade medalists in football
2019 FIFA Women's World Cup players
Medalists at the 2009 Summer Universiade